Apaj is a village in , Hungary.

Location 

The village is in the neighbourhood of Kiskunság National Park and is 
from Budapest. Primary route 51 serves the village by road. The Budapest–Kelebia
railway line’s station, Dömsöd is next to Apaj.

History 

It was royal property for a while, but later it was owned by nuns who lived on  Margaret Island. The Balassa family owned Apaj as well.

During  the Turkish rule of Ottoman Hungary the village suffered almost complete destruction, but from the 19th century the village was growing. At that time the village was called  (Apaj Plain).

After 1945 Apaj lost its title as a separate manor  and it became part of Dömsöd, but thanks to the Kinskunsag State Farm it once again became an independent village in 1985.

Apaj is famous of for horse breeding and cattle breeding and has an international reputation for racehorses. There are many great bustards too.

Between 1967 and 2006 the village held the Kiskunsag Shepherd and Jockey Festival.

Landmarks 
 Reformed church, which was built with the help of the Széchenyi Plan and dedicated on 24 April 2005
 Millennium Park
 Upper Kiskunsag Plain is part of the Kiskunsag National Park.

References

Notes

 

Populated places in Pest County